Corstorphine railway station served Corstorphine in the Scottish city of Edinburgh. Services were provided by trains on the Corstorphine Branch. It was a terminus of a branch line, and there were sidings.

History 
The station was opened by the North British Railway in 1902 and the line passed on to the Scottish Region of British Railways on nationalisation in 1948, to be then closed by the British Railways Board in 1968. 
The train journey from Corstorphine Station to Edinburgh Waverley Station took 11 minutes.

The site has since been built over by Mactaggart & Mickel, and is now occupied by the Paddockholm Estate.  Station Road nearby is named for the former station.

References

Notes

Sources 
 
 
 

Disused railway stations in Edinburgh
Railway stations in Great Britain opened in 1902
Railway stations in Great Britain closed in 1968
Former North British Railway stations
Corstorphine